This article provides details of international football games played by the Northern Cyprus national football team.

Results

2005

2006

2012

2016

2017

2018

References

Northern Cyprus national football team